The Đa Bút culture (5000–1000 BCE) is the name given to a period of the early Neolithic Age in Vietnam, after the name of the site in Vĩnh Lộc district. The Đa Bút site was excavated in the 1930s by :fr:Étienne Patte, and is a neolithic cemetery distinguished by shell middens. The site has recently been carbon-dated to 5000 BC. The people at the site were hunter-gatherers, and fishermen, with evidence of farming both of livestock and paddy rice. Other studies have given the site a slightly later date and found no evidence of food production.

See also
Two layer hypothesis

References

Ancient Vietnam
Archaeological cultures of Southeast Asia
Archaeological cultures in Vietnam
Neolithic cultures of Asia